Minerbe is a comune (municipality) in the Province of Verona in the Italian region Veneto, located about  west of Venice and about  southeast of Verona.

Twin towns
 Schwabenheim an der Selz, Germany, since 2001

References

External links
 Official website

Cities and towns in Veneto